The 1958 Pacific Tigers football team represented the College of the Pacific during the 1958 NCAA University Division football season.

Pacific competed as an independent in 1958. They played home games in Pacific Memorial Stadium in Stockton, California. In their sixth season under head coach Jack Myers, the Tigers finished with a record of six wins and four losses (6–4). For the season they outscored their opponents 266–178.

Schedule

Team players in the NFL
The following College of the Pacific players were selected in the 1959 NFL Draft.

Notes

References

Pacific
Pacific Tigers football seasons
Pacific Tigers football